Walter Lenkeit (25 June 1900 – 15 March 1986) was a German veterinarian. Lenkeit was professor at the University of Göttingen from 1936 till his retirement in 1970. His research was focused on Animal Nutrition.

References

1900 births
1986 deaths
German veterinarians